Novoslobodskaya is a Moscow Metro station in the Tverskoy District of the Central Administrative Okrug, Moscow. It is on the Koltsevaya Line, between Belorusskaya and Prospekt Mira stations. Novoslobodskaya was opened on 30 January 1952. From 21 November 2020 to 4 March 2022, the entrance of the station is closed for reconstruction.

Architecture and art

Alexey Dushkin, the station's architect, has long wished to utilise stained glass in decoration of a metro station, and the first drawings date to pre–World War II times. In 1948, with the aid of a young architect Alexander Strelkov, Dushkin came across the renowned artist Pavel Korin, who agreed to compose the artworks for the panels. The rest of the station was designed around the glass panels. Dushkin, taking the standard pylon layout designed the overall impression to resemble that of underground crypt.

It is best known for its 32 stained glass panels, which are the work of Latvian artists E. Veylandan, E. Krests, and M. Ryskin. Each panel, surrounded by an elaborate brass border, is set into one of the station's pylons and illuminated from within. Both the pylons and the pointed arches between them are faced with pinkish Ural marble and edged with brass molding. At the end of the platform is a mosaic by Pavel Korin entitled "Peace Throughout the World." The stained glass panels, the mosaic, the brass trim, and the elegant conical chandeliers were all carefully cleaned and restored in 2003.

The vestibule is an imposing structure with a grand portico, located on the northeast corner of Novoslobodskaya and Seleznevskaya streets.

Transfers 
From this station it is possible to transfer to Mendeleyevskaya station on the Serpukhovsko-Timiryazevskaya Line.

Gallery

Notes

External links

Moscow Metro stations
Koltsevaya Line
Public art in Russia
Tverskoy District
Railway stations in Russia opened in 1952
Stalinist architecture
Railway stations located underground in Russia
Cultural heritage monuments in Moscow